A double cantilever hangar is a type of hangar that was constructed by the United States Air Force during the Cold War. Large hangars were constructed at Castle Air Force Base, Loring Air Force Base, Carswell Air Force Base, and McGuire Air Force Base, while smaller hangars were constructed at March Air Force Base, Edwards Air Force Base, Hanscom Air Force Base, Travis Air Force Base, and Homestead Air Force Base.

See also
Loring Air Force Base Double Cantilever Hangar

References

United States Air Force